The 2021 Sam Houston Bearkats football team represented Sam Houston State University in the 2021 NCAA Division I FCS football season as a member of the Western Athletic Conference. The Bearkats were led by eighth-year head coach K. C. Keeler and played their home games at Bowers Stadium.

The Western Athletic Conference and ASUN Conference announced the formation of the WAC–ASUN Challenge (AQ7) for the 2021 season on February 23, 2021. The Challenge included the four fully qualified Division I (FCS) members of the WAC (Abilene Christian, Lamar, Sam Houston , and Stephen F. Austin) and Central Arkansas, Eastern Kentucky, and Jacksonville State of the ASUN Conference. The winner of the challenge received an auto-bid to the NCAA Division I FCS football playoffs.

Previous season

In 2020–21, the Bearkats finished the regular season 6–0, and 6–0 in the Southland, and won their eighth conference title.  The Bearkats then went 4–0 in the FCS playoffs to finish 10–0 as FCS champions.

Preseason

Preseason polls

WAC Poll
The Western Athletic Conference coaches released their preseason poll on July 27, 2021. The Bearkats were picked to finish first in the conference.  In addition, several Bearkats were selected to the preseason WAC Offense, Defense, and Special teams.  Eric Schmid was selected preseason offensive player of the year.  Jahari Kay was selected defensive player of the year.

 Note: Dixie State is not included since they are not playing a full WAC schedule due to previous non-conference game contracts.  Dixie State players are eligible for individual rewards.

Preseason All–WAC Team

Offense

Eric schmid – Quarterback, JR
Ramon jefferson – Running Back, JR
Ramon jefferson – Running Back, JR
Jequez ezzard – Wide Receiver, GR
Isaac schley – Tight End, GR
Eleasah anderson – Offensive Lineman, JR
Prince pines – Offensive Lineman, SO
Colby thomas – Offensive Lineman, SR

Defense

Jahari kay – Defensive Lineman, SR
Trace mascorro – Defensive Lineman, SR
Joseph wallace – Defensive Lineman, SR
Quentin brown – Linebacker, JR
Trevor williams – Linebacker, JR
Zyon McCollum – Defensive Back, SR
Jalen thomas – Defensive Back, SR

Special teams

Seth morgan – Kicker, FR
Matt mcrobert – Punter, SR
Jequez ezzard – Kick Returner, GR

AQ7 Poll
The AQ7 coaches also released their preseason poll on July 27, 2021. The Bearkats were picked to finish first in the ASUN-WAC Challenge.

Roster

Schedule

Game summaries

at Northern Arizona

Statistics

Southeast Missouri State

at No. 25 Central Arkansas

vs. Stephen F. Austin

Lamar

Statistics

Jacksonville State

at Tarleton State

Dixie State

Eastern Kentucky

at Abilene Christian

References

Sam Houston
Sam Houston Bearkats football seasons
Western Athletic Conference football champion seasons
2021 NCAA Division I FCS playoff participants
Sam Houston Bearkats football